Mel is a studio album by Brazilian singer Maria Bethânia, released in 1979.

Critical reception
The New York Times praised the title track, writing that Bethânia "declaims the highly poetic, startlingly sexual words as if singing a national anthem, and yet the song remains sly and infectious."

Track listing

References

1979 albums
Maria Bethânia albums
PolyGram albums